Landsat Island is a small, uninhabited island located at approximately 60°10'37"N 64°02'30"W,  off the northeast coast of Labrador (part of the Canadian province of Newfoundland and Labrador). It was discovered in 1976 during the analysis of imagery from the Landsat 1 satellite.

Discovery
In 1976, a Canadian coastal survey was carried out using data from the Landsat 1 satellite. Analysis of the data revealed several previously uncharted features; this includes Landsat Island, which was subsequently named after the satellite. Verification of the island's existence fell to Dr. Frank Hall of the Canadian Hydrographic Service:

Following Dr. Hall's encounter with the polar bear, it was suggested that the island be named "Polar Island," but the present name was retained.

Landsat Island marks the easternmost point of the Canadian land mass along this section of the Labrador coast.

References

External links
 NASA article: Landsat Island (April 19, 2006)
 David H. Gray, "Discovering Rocks off Labrador: A Photo Essay", IBRU Boundary and Security Bulletin, Summer 2000.

Uninhabited islands of Newfoundland and Labrador
Landsat program
1976 in Newfoundland and Labrador
Exploration of Canada